David Robert Patrick Eby  (born July 21, 1976) is a Canadian politician and lawyer who has been serving as the 37th and current premier of British Columbia since November 18, 2022, and has been serving as the leader of the British Columbia New Democratic Party (NDP) since October 21, 2022. A member of the Legislative Assembly of British Columbia, Eby has represented the riding of Vancouver-Point Grey since 2013. From 2017 to 2022, he served in the John Horgan cabinet as attorney general.

Early life and career 
Eby was born in 1976 in Kitchener, Ontario. His father, Brian, was a personal injury lawyer and his mother, Laura, was a teacher, and later a grade school principal. The eldest of 4 children, he has a sister, and two brothers, named Matthew and Patrick. As a teenager, he took his brother to protest against the treatment of circus elephants. He was president of St. Mary’s High School in his final year.

He studied English at the University of Waterloo and worked for a communications firm after graduation. In 2004, he graduated from Schulich School of Law in Halifax, Nova Scotia. He articled for the federal Department of Justice and was called to the bar in June 2005.

He worked at Pivot Legal Society from 2005 to 2008 in Vancouver's Downtown Eastside before becoming the executive director of the British Columbia Civil Liberties Association (BCCLA) from 2008 until 2012. He is the author of The Arrest Handbook: A Guide to Your Rights, published by the BCCLA.

He was an adjunct professor of law at the University of British Columbia (UBC) from 2009 to 2013, and also served as president of the Canadian HIV/AIDS Legal Network and as a research associate with the Canadian Centre for Policy Alternatives.

Early political career (2008–2017) 
In 2008, Eby sought a Vancouver city council nomination from Vision Vancouver but was unsuccessful.

In 2011, Eby stood as the NDP candidate in the by-election for Vancouver-Point Grey. The riding had been vacated by former premier Gordon Campbell and was being contested by newly sworn-in premier Christy Clark, of the BC Liberal Party, who did not hold a seat in the legislature. Eby placed a close second, only 595 votes behind Clark. Two years later, ahead of the 2013 general election, he again sought the NDP nomination in Vancouver-Point Grey for a rematch against Clark. On election day, Eby defeated Clark in a rare instance of a premier being unseated despite their party winning re-election.

After his election as MLA, Eby was named to the NDP shadow cabinet as critic for advanced education. Eby strongly considered standing in the 2014 British Columbia New Democratic Party leadership election, but declined after learning his then-fiancée was pregnant. He then served as campaign co-chair of John Horgan's successful leadership bid. Later that year, Eby became critic for tourism, housing, gaming and liquor policy. As housing critic, he called for an inquiry into Vancouver's real estate market over a practice called "shadow flipping", suggesting it was being done as part of tax avoidance and money laundering.

In 2016, former NDP premier Glen Clark described Eby as "the future of the NDP".

Attorney General of British Columbia (2017–2022)
Following the 2017 British Columbia election, which saw the NDP form government with the support of the Green Party, Eby was appointed to the cabinet of John Horgan as attorney general. He additionally became minister responsible for liquor, gaming and the Insurance Corporation of British Columbia (ICBC).

During Eby's tenure, British Columbia passed anti-SLAPP legislation. BC briefly had similar legislation in 2001, enacted by the then-incumbent NDP government that year before being repealed by the subsequent Liberal government. The new law was stronger than the previous version, removing the requirement to prove the person suing had bad intentions and needing only to show that being sued negatively impacted their ability to express an opinions a matter of public interest. Josh Paterson, the executive director of the BC Civil Liberties Association, said the law should be "the model that other provinces should seek to copy."

In 2018, Maclean's described Eby's workload as "handl[ing] every live grenade in BC politics."

On July 19, 2022, Eby stepped down from cabinet in order to stand in the 2022 British Columbia New Democratic Party leadership election.

ICBC reform 
On July 24, 2017, Eby released a report by accounting firm Ernst & Young that concluded that ICBC was in a poor financial situation. The report found the problem to lie in "the rising number and size of claims, larger cash settlements for minor injuries, and more claims costs going towards legal representation than to claimants", and that without significant reform, premiums for drivers would have to rise by almost 30 percent in two years to avoid significant losses. Over the next few months, Eby enacted immediate measures to help tackle the issue, including a rate hike of 6.4%, red light cameras at high-collision intersections, and a pilot program to eliminate distracted driving. On January 28, 2018, ICBC projected a net loss of $1.3 billion by the end of the current fiscal year. The following day, Eby described ICBC as a "financial dumpster fire" due to the "reckless decisions" and negligence of the previous Liberal government: "They knew the dumpster was on fire, but they pushed it behind the building instead of trying to put the fire out." Eby promised "major reforms to make ICBC financially viable again" would be announced shortly, but ruled out a switch to a no-fault insurance system.

On February 7, 2018, the BC government announced several major changes to accident coverage. The payment for soft-injury claims was capped at $5,500; medical benefits and wage loss payments were doubled; common treatments became pre-approved; payouts changed from a lump-sum to a "care-based model" to cover costs on an as-needed basis; and ICBC changed its dispute-resolution mechanism to a new civil resolution system to reduce legal costs. The changes were estimated to save $1 billion a year, though Eby did not rule out a rate increase in the future. In September 2018, a new method of calculating insurance premiums came into effect that was more heavily weighted towards driving experience and crash history, and overall determined more by driver than vehicle. The change was expected to be revenue neutral, with two-thirds of drivers seeing their rates reduced but the remaining third of riskier drivers paying substantially more.

On February 7, 2019, ICBC reported a net loss of $860 million in the first nine months of the fiscal year. The corporation blamed the loss on the escalating cost of insurance claims, and Eby said that reports from expert witnesses — some files including as much as six medical experts — were driving the costs. Four days later, on February 11, Eby announced a cap on expert witnesses, to a maximum of three. On October 24, 2019, the Supreme Court of British Columbia struck down the cap, finding it "infringe[d] on the court's core jurisdiction to control its process". The province decided not to appeal and instead pursued new legislation to limit the number of expert reports while making allowances for judicial discretion on whether additional experts are needed.

On February 6, 2020, Eby, alongside Premier Horgan, announced that ICBC would be moving to a no-fault system. The change limited the types of collision where an ICBC customer can go to court for damage, with disputes instead being handled through the Civil Resolution Tribunal. The change to a no-fault system was justified as dramatically reducing the legal costs of ICBC, faster payment of benefits, and lower premiums. The announcement was criticized by the Trial Lawyers Association of BC. The introduction of no-fault insurance came despite Eby having previously ruled it out; Eby justified his change of mind by saying "I had too much confidence that the legal system could change more quickly than it actually can … I also had an inadequate understanding of how poorly the existing system supports people who have been in accidents." Eby had been investigating the merits of no-fault insurance since late 2018; after having been told by ICBC officials that his cap on injury costs would save $1 billion annually but still wasn't enough to prevent a 36% rate increase over the next five years, Eby was convinced the current set-up was unsustainable. Horgan had given his approval in December 2019.

The NDP government's 2020 budget projected an $86 million surplus for ICBC in the 2020/21 fiscal year, growing to $191 million by 2022/2023. It was the first posted surplus for the corporation since 2015/16. On March 2, 2020, Eby announced plans to introduce legislation to ensure ICBC's profits would remain in the corporation, used to reduce premiums or increase benefits, and prevent governments using it to cover other expenses — a practice Eby had previously criticized the Liberal government for, and that he said had contributed to ICBC's poor financial state.

On March 4, 2020, the government that the maximum payout for serious disabling injuries would rise from $300,000 to $7.5 million; the move was to be financed by further moving disputes from court to the civil resolution tribunal, expected to save $1.5 billion in legal fees. Eby predicted the new amendments would lead to a "street fight" with personal injury lawyers. The legislation was challenged by the Trial Lawyers Association of BC, and on March 3, 2021, the BC Supreme Court struck down the rules. It found that the government's decision to move the determination of accident claims out of the court system to its own tribunals to be unconstitutional, and rejected the government's argument that injury cases were clogging the court system. The government appealed the decision, and on May 17, 2022, the BC Court of Appeal reversed the lower court's decision and sided with the government.

Money Laundering - Civil Forfeiture 

In 2006 the government of the day in British Columbia passed the Civil Forfeiture Act. This Act allowed for the creation of the BC Civil Forfeiture Office, which was established and commenced operations in 2007. From inception, the BC Civil Forfeiture Office has proven a highly effective policy response to money laundering and is specifically adept at recovering proceeds of crime. To 2022, the BC CFO has recovered more than $100 million from those laundering the proceeds of crime.

In 2009, a legal challenge to the Ontario Civil Forfeiture Act, which was substantially similar to those in other provinces including the BC Act, reached the Supreme Court of Canada in the case of Chatterjee v Ontario (Attorney General), 2009 SCC 19.

At the time Chatterjee was heard by the SCC, Eby was the Executive Director of the BC Civil Liberties Association (he was director from 2008 to 2012). The BCCLA, under Eby’s leadership, was a vehement and vociferous opponent to civil forfeiture. Under Eby’s direction the BCCLA went so far as to seek, and was granted, intervenor status in Chatterjee.  The BCCLA made extensive submissions at the SCC hearing calling for the striking down of civil forfeiture laws which, if those arguments had been successful, would have resulted in the abolition of the BC Civil Forfeiture Office and the removal of one of the most effective anti-money laundering strategies developed in the last quarter century. Under Eby, the BCCLA was one of the organizations most committed to the abolition of civil forfeiture laws, despite the proven record of these laws in the fight against money laundering.

When Eby became part of the NDP government in 2017, he took a position diametrically opposed to that of the BCCLA when he was head of the organization. Recently, with the Civil Forfeiture Office’s successful forfeiture of three Hells Angel’s clubhouses, Eby has trumpeted late and largely inconsequential amendments of questionable effect to the Civil Forfeiture Act as proof his government was getting tough on crime. Eby, however, tends to omit mentioning his prior opposition to civil forfeiture laws and the fact the entire regime would not exist but for his political opponents. All of which has led some citizens to observe that Eby’s stance on money laundering seems to vacillate to align with his perceived political fortunes of the day.

Money Laundering 
Shortly after being appointed Attorney General, Eby claimed he discovered that large scale money laundering was prevalent in BC, particularly in the real estate and casino sectors of the economy. He immediately assigned blame to his political foes whom he intimated had been willful blind or corrupt. Over the next several months Eby made a number of media appearances where he claimed that hundreds of millions of dollars had been laundered through real estate and casinos. He hired former police officer Peter German to conduct an investigation into money laundering. German concluded that $100 million dollars had been laundered in BC, but when asked about the sum at the press conference with Eby announcing his findings, German was unable to explain how he arrived at the figure. His report does not actually contain the $100 million figure or provide supporting data or explanation as to how this sum was quantified; its origin remains without a factual explanation or basis.

On March 27, 2018, Eby testified before the Canadian Parliament where he stated that gamblers were permitted to enter government casinos with vast sums of cash in a bag, and exchange that cash for a casino cheque thus allowing the money to be laundered. An independent audit conducted by the global accounting firm Ernst and Young looked at every casino cheque issued during the period in question and determined conclusively that not a single cheque had been issued in exchange for cash as Eby had alleged. The EY findings are based on demonstrable and immutable facts, which are available for independent verification, and sit in direct contradiction to Eby’s testimony before Parliament. There is no indication Eby has done anything to correct the record.

Eby’s media appearances and claims of a vast money laundering network in the Province, along with German’s report, and yet another Eby commissioned report by an “expert panel” (released May 8, 2019) which claimed that an astounding $5.3 billion had been laundered through real estate, led to a moral panic which fueled calls for a public inquiry. Eby maintained that a public inquiry was not necessary but the magnitude of the concern he created became such that he was compelled to reverse position and on May 15, 2019, he established a public inquiry headed by BC Supreme Court justice Austin Cullen.

Cullen found there had been no systemic or large scale money laundering involving real estate, a finding which impugned Eby’s claims, as well as the purported findings of his report writers, that there had been billions laundered through real estate. Cullen further found that it was not possible to quantify the exact amount of money laundered in BC (contrary to the dollar values claimed and propagated by Eby and German) and that while the amount was likely substantial, it wasn’t disproportionate to that occurring anywhere else in Canada. He also found that, contrary to Eby’s aspersions, there was no corruption on the part of the former government.

Prior to the Inquiry, Eby had provided the data for and promoted a report by Simon Fraser Researcher Andy Yan which suggested that persons with non-anglicized Chinese names were suspiciously home owners in Vancouver. The data was a non-randomized and extremely small sample calling into question the validity, reliability and motivation behind the report. It has also been noted that German’s report makes reference to “China” and “Chinese” more than a hundred times but fails to mention any other visibly identifiable ethnic group leading to a perception that the report suggests only those of Chinese descent were engaged in money laundering. Eby was required to testify under oath at the Inquiry. The BC Civil Liberties Association, in its submissions to the Inquiry, noted that during his testimony Eby had been forced to admit that he had, unfairly and without foundation, stoked anti-Asian sentiment in the Province.

The lack of consonance between Eby’s rhetoric on money laundering and Cullen’s findings, the fact that there has not been a single individual charged, prosecuted, or convicted of a money laundering offence involving the real estate or casino sectors despite claims of overwhelming evidence of such offences, and the racial overtones have led some to conclude the entire exercise was a costly exercise in political adventurism motivated by a desire to create political advantage through damage to the opposition.

Electoral reform 

As part of the deal with the Greens, the NDP government committed to holding a referendum on electoral reform. On October 4, 2017, Eby announced that the referendum would be conducted by mail ballot in by the end of November 2018 and would require a simple province-wide majority to be approved. Between November 2017 and February 2018, Eby conducted public consultation on what questions should be on the ballot. On May 30, Eby announced that the ballot would be two questions: the first asking whether to change to from the current first-past-the-post (FPTP) system to a proportional representation (PR) system, and the second asking voters to pick between three different models: dual-member proportional, mixed-member proportional and rural-urban proportional. On December 20, 2018, Elections BC announced that 61.3 percent of ballots voted to keep FPTP.

In a post-referendum interview, Eby explained that the two-question ballot was the result of the public consultations, and reflected a lack of consensus on an alternative system. He admitted surprise at how decisive the result was, but did not think any form of PR would have won in a single-ballot referendum, and concluded "It does not seem to me British Columbians were in favour of changing the system. They seem happy with the system we have."

Housing 
After the 2020 election, Eby was given the additional role of minister responsible for housing.

In an interview with the Times Colonist in February 2021, Eby outlined his goal to move everyone living in Victoria's parks into shelter by the end of March, and everyone living in Vancouver's Strathcona Park into shelter by the end of April. While this would require "an array of responses" that included temporary pod-like housing, Eby clarified that permanent housing was the end goal. The government later signed deals with the cities of Victoria and Vancouver to this effect.

As minister, Eby vigorously pushed for more homeless shelters, lobbying municipal governments and politicians to approve zoning plans and permit extensions ahead of their votes. Eby's actions drew criticism from some municipal politicians, such as the mayors of Cranbrook and Penticton, but he defended his approach: "I would be incredibly negligent in not [speaking] to municipal leaders that are voting on vitally important projects to prevent entrenched encampments in their communities."

Eby faced notable conflict with the City of Penticton. On March 2, 2021, the city council voted unanimously to deny a temporary-use permit to BC Housing that the agency needed to continue to run an emergency winter homeless shelter past March 31. Eby called the news "profoundly troubling", and noted that the council had assured him that they would grant the permit. Eby further said it was important to keep the shelter open until the agency built an additional supportive housing unit. Two weeks later, on March 18, Eby announced that the government would be using its power of paramountcy to overrule the council. That July, Penticton officially filed with the BC Supreme Court to challenge the provincial government's use of paramountcy powers.

In 2021, the BC government hired accounting firm Ernst & Young to conduct an independent probe of the BC Housing agency; their report, completed in May 2022, found the agency had inadequate oversight, and that unclear roles and responsibilities potentially impacted its ability to manage risks. Following the public release of the report, Eby dismissed the agency's board of commissioners. In July, he ordered a forensic audit of BC Housing.

Premier of British Columbia (since 2022)

NDP leadership campaign

In his 2022 leadership campaign, Eby advocated multiple solutions to the province's housing crisis. To combat flipping, Eby proposed a tax on the sale of residences that are sold within two years of being purchased.

Eby was endorsed by 48 of his caucus colleagues. On October 20, 2022, Eby won the leadership race by default after the disqualification of Anjali Appadurai, his only challenger. He was declared the leader of the BC New Democratic Party and premier-designate of British Columbia on October 21, 2022.

Tenure 
Eby was sworn in on November 18, 2022, in a ceremony led by the Musqueam Indian Band. He outlined housing, public safety and health care as his priorities. Immediately after being sworn in, Eby announced two tax creditsa one-time credit for electricity bills and a new BC Affordability Credit for low-to-medium income familiesto help deal with affordability concerns.

Personal life 

His wife, Cailey Lynch, was a registered nurse, and later studied medicine at UBC and is now a family doctor. They have a son, Ezra, and a daughter, Iva. Eby has been a vegetarian since he was 14 after reading Diet for a New America.

Eby played in and provided vocals for several electro-indie rock bands, including Ladner and World of Science.

Elections

References

External links
Official website
The Arrest Handbook: A Guide to Your Rights

1977 births
21st-century Canadian politicians
Living people
Premiers of British Columbia
Attorneys General of British Columbia
British Columbia New Democratic Party MLAs
Canadian civil rights lawyers
Canadian King's Counsel
Canadian Mennonites
Lawyers in British Columbia
Members of the Executive Council of British Columbia
Members of the Legislative Assembly of British Columbia
Politicians from Kitchener, Ontario
Politicians from Vancouver
Academic staff of the University of British Columbia
Canadian nonprofit executives
Canadian people of German descent